Danny Walters (born 1 June 1993) is an English actor, known for his roles as Tiger Dyke in the ITV sitcom Benidorm and Keanu Taylor in the BBC soap opera EastEnders.

Career 
From 2014 to 2017, Walters played Tiger Dyke in the ITV sitcom Benidorm. He also made guest appearances in the BAFTA-nominated BBC miniseries Our World War and the BBC series Call the Midwife, in 2014 and 2016. During Christmas of 2016, he took on the title role of Jack in his first pantomime Jack and the Beanstalk at the Billingham Forum Theatre.

In May 2017, it was announced that he would be appearing in the BBC soap opera EastEnders, portraying the role of Keanu Taylor.  He quit the soap in November 2019, and his final scenes aired on 21 February 2020. Walters made an unannounced return to the show in December 2022.

Filmography

Awards and nominations

References

External links
 

1993 births
21st-century British male actors
British male television actors
Living people
Male actors from Essex
People from Harlow